The Māori Language Commission is an autonomous Crown entity in New Zealand set up under the Māori Language Act 1987 with the following functions:

 To initiate, develop, co-ordinate, review, advise upon, and assist in the implementation of policies, procedures, measures, and practices designed to give effect to the declaration in section 3 of this Act of the Māori language as an official language of New Zealand
 Generally to promote the Māori language, and, in particular, its use as a living language and as an ordinary means of communication
 The functions conferred on the Commission by sections 15 to 20 of this Act in relation to certificates of competency in the Māori language
 To consider and report to the Minister upon any matter relating to the Māori language that the Minister may from time to time refer to the Commission for its advice
 Such other functions as may be conferred upon the Commission by any other enactment

See also 
 Language policy
 Language revival
 List of language regulators

External links 

1987 establishments in New Zealand
Government agencies established in 1987
Language revival
Language regulators
Māori language
Māori organisations
New Zealand autonomous Crown entities